Tony Field (born 6 July 1946) is an English former professional footballer who played as a striker. Active in both England and the United States between 1963 and 1981, Field made nearly 500 career League appearances, scoring over 150 goals.

Career
Born in Halifax, Field played youth football with hometown club Halifax Town, before turning professional in 1963. Field also played in the Football League with Barrow, Southport, Blackburn Rovers and Sheffield United.

Field later played in the North American Soccer League for the New York Cosmos (being on the 1977 NASL Soccer Bowl Champions team), the Memphis Rogues, and the New England Tea Men.

References

1946 births
Living people
English footballers
Halifax Town A.F.C. players
Barrow A.F.C. players
Southport F.C. players
Blackburn Rovers F.C. players
Sheffield United F.C. players
Memphis Rogues players
North American Soccer League (1968–1984) indoor players
New England Tea Men players
New York Cosmos players
North American Soccer League (1968–1984) players
English Football League players
English expatriate sportspeople in the United States
Expatriate soccer players in the United States
English expatriate footballers
Association football forwards